Gescher is a municipality in the district of Borken, in North Rhine-Westphalia, Germany. It is located near the border with the Netherlands. It is most often known for its bell work, and it includes a Museum of Bells.

Geography 

Gescher is surrounded by farming communities and can be seen as more of a rural town.

Farming Communities and Suburbs 

Farming Communities and suburbs belonging to Gescher include:

 Harwick
 Estern
 Büren
 Tungerloh-Capellen
 Tungerloh-Pröbsting
 Hochmoor

Location

Gescher is located in the western half of the Regierungsbezirk, Münsterland. It finds itself within the District of Borken, just to the south of Stadtlohn. To the east lies the District of Coesfeld, and the Dutch border can be found to the west.

The river, Berkel runs through Gescher and used to be used extensively to deliver goods between Dutch towns and Münster.

History 

The early history of Gescher starts as a connecting stop on a postal route running from Muenster to the Netherlands. In 1570, Gescher suffered an enormous village-wide fire that destroyed the entire town. During the time of reconstruction, many looters came over from the Netherlands to take advantage of the unfortunate situation. After the Second World War, Gescher was under the control of Mr. Ball and the British sovereignty in Germany. Gescher was under the authority of Kreis Coesfeld up until 1975 when Gescher was pulled into Kreis Borken.

Population Changes over the Years

Local council (Rat)

Elections in 2014: Vote share and seats

CDU	        41,7 %=14 seats
SPD	        24,2 %= 8 seats
UWG	        14,6 %= 5 seats
The Greens	13,1 %= 5 seats	     
FDP	         6,3 %= 2 seats
Total                 34 seats

Infrastructure

Transportation

Private

The Bundesautobahn 31 connects Gescher with the Ruhr Region and the North Sea.

The Bundesstrasse 525 connects Gescher with the Dutch border and Nottuln/Bundesautobahn 43.

Public

Bus

Westfalenbus operates a few scheduled bus services through Gescher:

Rail

Up until 1985, Gescher was on the railroad offering services between Empel and Muenster. The old train station building can still be seen on the southside of Gescher.

Air

The closest general aviation airport is Stadtlohn-Vreden Airport, located about 15 kilometers from Gescher. The closest airport with scheduled commercial traffic is Münster Osnabrück International Airport, which is located about 50 kilometers away from Gescher. A way bigger alternative is the Düsseldorf Airport, which is located about 85 kilometers from Gescher.

Sons and daughters of the city
 Heinrich Hörnemann (1906-1977), farmer and German politician (CDU), Member of Bundestag 1961-1969
 Peter Schmidt (born 1944), German writer, multiple recipient (first and second place) of the Deutscher Krimi Preis
 August Wessing (1880-1945), Catholic clergyman and NS victim, died in Dachau concentration camp
 G. Mescher (2000), Naamgenoot van de stad

Photos

References

External links
  Official site 

Borken (district)